Errol Prisby (January 24, 1943 – February 19, 2006) was an American football defensive back. He played for the Denver Broncos in 1967.

He died on February 19, 2006, in Kent, Ohio at age 63.

References

1943 births
2006 deaths
American football defensive backs
Cincinnati Bearcats football players
Denver Broncos players